No More Sadface is the fourth EP released by the Denver, Colorado based trio Single File. It features the radio hit "Zombies Ate My Neighbors" and was their first release on Reprise Records.

Track listing
 "Zombies Ate My Neighbors" – 3:04
 "Velcro" – 3:09
 "Melody of You" – 2:40
 "September Skyline" – 3:15

Personnel
Sloan Anderson—Vocals, Guitar, Bass guitar
Joe Ginsberg—Bass, Guitar, Backing Vocals, Piano
Chris Depew -- drums, Backing Vocals, Piano

References

2007 EPs